Benós is a locality located in the municipality of Es Bòrdes, in the Province of Lleida of Catalonia, Spain. As of 2020, it has a population of 26.

Geography 
Benós is located 170km north of Lleida.

References

Populated places in the Province of Lleida